Events in the year 2001 in Brazil.

Incumbents

Federal government
 President: Fernando Henrique Cardoso
 Vice President: Marco Maciel

Governors
 Acre: Jorge Viana 
 Alagoas: Ronaldo Lessa 
 Amapa: João Capiberibe
 Amazonas: Amazonino Mendes
 Bahia: César Borges 
 Ceará: Tasso Jereissati 
 Espírito Santo: José Ignácio Ferreira 
 Goiás: Marconi Perillo 
 Maranhão: Roseana Sarney
 Mato Grosso: Dante de Oliveira then Rogério Salles
 Mato Grosso do Sul: José Orcírio Miranda dos Santos
 Minas Gerais: Itamar Franco 
 Pará: Almir Gabriel 
 Paraíba: José Maranhão 
 Paraná: Jaime Lerner 
 Pernambuco: Jarbas Vasconcelos 
 Piauí: 
 till 6 November: Mão Santa
 9 November-19 November: Kléber Eulálio
 from 19 November: Hugo Napoleão 
 Rio de Janeiro: Anthony Garotinho
 Rio Grande do Norte: Garibaldi Alves Filho 
 Rio Grande do Sul: Olívio Dutra 
 Rondônia: José de Abreu Bianco 
 Roraima: Neudo Ribeiro Campos 
 Santa Catarina: Esperidião Amin 
 São Paulo: Mário Covas (till 6 March); Geraldo Alckmin (from 6 March)
 Sergipe: Albano Franco 
 Tocantins: José Wilson Siqueira Campos

Vice governors
 Acre: Edison Simão Cadaxo 
 Alagoas: Geraldo Costa Sampaio 
 Amapá: Maria Dalva de Souza Figueiredo 
 Amazonas: Samuel Assayag Hanan 
 Bahia: Otto Alencar 
 Ceará: Benedito Clayton Veras Alcântara 
 Espírito Santo: Celso José Vasconcelos 
 Goiás: Alcides Rodrigues Filho 
 Maranhão: José Reinaldo Carneiro Tavares 
 Mato Grosso: José Rogério Sales 
 Mato Grosso do Sul: Moacir Kohl 
 Minas Gerais: Newton Cardoso 
 Pará: Hildegardo de Figueiredo Nunes 
 Paraíba: Antônio Roberto de Sousa Paulino 
 Paraná: Emília de Sales Belinati 
 Pernambuco: José Mendonça Bezerra Filho 
 Piauí: Osmar Ribeiro de Almeida Júnior (till 6 November); Felipe Mendes de Oliveira (from 19 November)
 Rio de Janeiro: Benedita da Silva
 Rio Grande do Norte: Fernando Freire 
 Rio Grande do Sul: Miguel Soldatelli Rossetto 
 Rondônia: Miguel de Souza 
 Roraima: Francisco Flamarion Portela 
 Santa Catarina: Paulo Roberto Bauer
 São Paulo: Geraldo Alckmin (till 6 March); vacant (from 6 March)
 Sergipe: Benedito de Figueiredo
 Tocantins: João Lisboa da Cruz

Events 
December 3 – An airline, Transbrasil was all regular flights cease operation on without license.

Births
 June 18 – Gabriel Martinelli, footballer

Deaths 
 March 6 – Mário Covas, then Governor of São Paulo (b. 1930)
 August 10 – Jorge Amado, Brazil's best known modern writer (b. 1912)
 October 9 – Roberto de Oliveira Campos, economist (b. 1917)
 December 29 – Cássia Eller, musician (b. 1962)

See also 
2001 in Brazilian football
2001 in Brazilian television
List of Brazilian films of 2001

References

 
2000s in Brazil
Years of the 21st century in Brazil
Brazil
Brazil